Alan Thomas Amos (born 10 November 1952) is a British politician who sat as Conservative Member of Parliament for Hexham from 1987 to 1992. After a spell in the Labour Party, he currently sits as a Conservative member of Worcester City Council.

Early life
He attended the independent St Albans School. He studied PPE at St John's College, Oxford. From the Institute of Education, he gained a PGCE in 1976.

From 1976 to 1984, he was an Economics teacher, and a sixth form Form-teacher, at Dame Alice Owen's School in Hertfordshire. From 1986 to 1987, he was Assistant Principal of Davies's College of Further Education (now called Davies's Independent 6th Form College) on Old Gloucester Street  in Queen's Square.

From 1978 to 1987 he was a Conservative councillor on Enfield Borough Council.

At the 1983 general election, he stood unsuccessfully in Walthamstow.

Parliamentary career
Amos was elected as the Conservative Member of Parliament for Hexham in the 1987 general election.

In Parliament, Amos was known for his right wing views, e.g., he believed rapists and muggers should be flogged. He was opposed to tobacco advertising.

Shortly before the 1992 general election, Amos was arrested, along with another man, at a well known homosexual pickup spot on Hampstead Heath. Amos was not charged but accepted a police caution for indecency, and stood down as MP for Hexham.

Conversion to Labour
After failing to be readopted as a Conservative local councillor in the London Borough of Enfield, where he had previously been deputy leader of the council, he joined the Labour Party in 1994, giving a self-exculpatory interview to The Spectator magazine. In the 2001 general election he fought the Hitchin and Harpenden constituency for Labour, coming second to the Conservative Peter Lilley.

He was elected for Labour to the Millwall ward of the London Borough of Tower Hamlets in 2002, serving as councillor for four years before losing the seat to the Conservatives in the 2006 election. He returned to local politics in May 2008 with his election to the Warndon ward of Worcester City Council.

Independent councillor
Following the May 2014 local government elections, the composition of Worcester City Council was 17 Conservative, 16 Labour, 1 Liberal Democrat and 1 Green, making both major groups reliant on minority support to gain control of the council. Before the Council AGM, Alan Amos announced he was leaving the Labour group to sit as an Independent councillor, allegedly from dissatisfaction that he had not been selected by Labour as a future Mayor of Worcester. At the council's AGM on 3 June 2014, Amos accepted the Conservative nomination as Mayor of Worcester, and as Mayor, voted for the Council administration to change from Labour to Conservative.

Move back to the Conservatives
Following the May 2015 local government elections and hours before his tenure as Mayor of Worcester was to end, Alan Amos announced he was rejoining the Conservative party.

Controversies
In 2016 Amos claimed women make up rape.
He is known for his right-wing views on immigration, when in 2019, 23 child asylum seekers were resettled in Worcestershire.
He has also made derogatory remarks about cyclists when he called cyclists "... morons and dangerous" as well as describing courier riders as "...Deliveroo Idiots".

References

External links 
 
 Worcester City Council
 They Work For You

1952 births
Living people
Conservative Party (UK) MPs for English constituencies
Councillors in the London Borough of Enfield
Councillors in the London Borough of Tower Hamlets
Labour Party (UK) councillors
UK MPs 1987–1992
People from St Albans
Alumni of St Peter's College, Oxford
Presidents of the Oxford University Conservative Association
Alumni of the UCL Institute of Education
People educated at St Albans School, Hertfordshire
English LGBT politicians
LGBT members of the Parliament of the United Kingdom
Labour Party (UK) parliamentary candidates
21st-century English LGBT people